Ben Mockford (born 18 August 1989) is a British basketball player for Newcastle Eagles of the British Basketball League (BBL) and the Great Britain national team.

Professional career
On 10 December 2020, Mockford signed a short-term contract with the Bristol Flyers for the 2020–21 BBL season. On 27 October 2021, he signed with Cheshire Phoenix of the BBL.

In August 2022, Mockford signed with the Newcastle Eagles.

National team career
Mockford earned his first cap for the Great Britain national team in an international friendly against Latvia in Worcester, England, on 19 July 2014. Mockford had his first stellar performance with the team during an FIBA EuroBasket 2015 qualifier against Bosnia and Herzegovina, scoring 19 points on 5/8 shooting from three point range. He was a regular member of head coach Joe Prunty's squads from 2014 to 2017, and was selected to play for GB at the FIBA EuroBasket 2017.

References

1989 births
Living people
People from Shoreham-by-Sea
Sportspeople from West Sussex
British expatriate basketball people
British expatriate basketball people in Spain
British expatriate basketball people in the United States
English expatriate sportspeople in Spain
English expatriate sportspeople in the United States
English men's basketball players
Iona Gaels men's basketball players
St. Francis Brooklyn Terriers men's basketball players
Shooting guards
Cheshire Phoenix players
Bristol Flyers players